The 2011 Seychelles First Division (also known as the 2011 Barclays First Division) is the highest competitive football league in the Seychelles, which was founded in 1979. It began on 24 February 2011.

St Michel United FC retained the title, their 10th championship win in 16 years. The Lions were relegated.

Teams
Due to the increase of teams from 8 to 10, Northern Dynamo who finished in 7th place in 2010 did not play a relegation playoff game, instead they stayed in the First Division. However the 8th placed team St Roch United had a playoff game against Second Division side St John Bosco. The game ended 4–2 in favour of St Roch after extra time, therefore St Roch stayed in the First Division. Second Division winners and runners-up Côte d’Or and The Lions respectively, were promoted. Having received sponsorship from Sligo Rovers F.C. in June 2011 many of the teams in Seychelles have benefited from the advent of modern sports grounds which allow the players access to modern facilities such as showers and pitches.

League table

Results

Relegation play-off

Top scorers

President’s Cup
Prior to the 2011 Seychelles First Division, the President's Cup was played between the 2010 league winners, St Michel United and the 2010 Land Marine Cup winners St Louis Suns United.

References

External links
 Soccerway
 Seychelles Nation

2011
First Division
Seychelles First Division